In Australian culture sports carnivals are held to perform competitions in the individual or team disciplines like athletics, swimming or surf lifesaving. Teams from different clubs or schools gather together for both individual point-score and team score. Often, the carnival is opened by a parade with the teams marching in uniforms and flags over the field of competition.

Surf carnival

Surf Life Saving Clubs in Australia train their nippers and young life savers for competitions in surf carnivals. Local, regional, state and nationwide competitions are held across the country. Junior carnivals compete for age groups starting from under-8 to under-14, while senior competitions among active surf life savers start from under-15 to veterans. Veterans are athletes 30 years and older; the age groups are in 5-year blocks: 30–34, 35–39, 40–44, all the way up to 65+. Surf boat competitions start from 16+.

See also
 Sports day
 The Coolangatta Gold

References
 National Museum of Australia - Surf Competitions
 The Surf Carnival, by Ross Renwick
 Bronte's first Surf Carnival
 2007 - Year of the Surf Life Saver
 Aussies 2007 - National Surf Competitions
 The 2013 International Surf Rescue Challenge, Onjuku Beach

!
Surf lifesaving
Carnivals
Sports festivals in Australia